Salix apoda, the Caucasian willow (an appellation it shares with other members of its genus), is a species of flowering plant in the family Salicaceae, native to the Caucasus and northern Turkey. A prostrate shrub, it is occasionally cultivated as an ornamental ground cover in rock gardens, particularly the males, since they produce large, silvery catkins that then erupt in yellow stamens.

References

apoda
Flora of the Caucasus
Flora of Turkey
Plants described in 1866